Leng Rong (born August 1953) is a Chinese politician and the current deputy director of the National People's Congress Education, Science, Culture and Public Health Committee. He is a member of the 19th Central Committee of the Chinese Communist Party.

Biography
Leng was born in Pingdu County, Shandong, in August 1953. In September 1969, he became a soldier in the Fifth Division of the Heilongjiang Production and Construction Corps.In January 1973, he was transferred to Beijing No.2 Machine Tool Works. After the resumption of college entrance examination, in September 1979, he entered Peking University, majoring in philosophy. 

He was vice president of Chinese Academy of Social Sciences in November 2004, and held that office until December 2007. Then he succeeded Teng Wensheng as director of the Party Documents Research Office of the Central Committee of the Chinese Communist Party. He was also president of the Chinese Society of Scientific Socialism and Chinese Communist Literature Research Association. In March 2018, the Party Documents Research Office of the Central Committee of the Chinese Communist Party was revoked and its function was merged into the newly founded , he was made president. In March 2018, he was appointed deputy director of the National People's Congress Education, Science, Culture and Public Health Committee.

References

1953 births
Living people
Chinese Communist Party politicians from Shandong
Members of the Standing Committee of the 13th National People's Congress
People from Pingdu
Peking University alumni
People's Republic of China politicians from Shandong